The Museum for Historical Maybach Vehicles is a privately owned automobile museum in Neumarkt in der Oberpfalz, Bavaria, Germany. Opened in 2009, it is the first and only museum in the world to be devoted exclusively to the Maybach brand of automobiles.

See also
Automuseum Dr. Carl Benz
List of automobile museums
Mercedes-Benz Museum

References

Notes

Bibliography

External links

Museum for Historical Maybach Vehicles – official site 

Automobile museums in Germany
Maybach
Museums in Bavaria
Neumarkt (district)